Lake Charleston is a reservoir in Coles County, Illinois.  Served by Illinois Route 130, it is 2 miles (3 km) southeast of the Illinois city of Charleston.  Much of the lake is surrounded by city parkland, and a lakeside circular trail is 3.6 miles (6.0 km) in length.  Power boats are allowed, but the lake enforces a no-wake rule.  There is a fishing pier.    

The lake is located in Charleston Township and the adjacent Hutton Township.  The reservoir is fed by the adjacent Embarras River, which was dammed by engineers to create the reservoir.  The reservoir is served by Exit 119 on Interstate 70 in nearby Cumberland County.

References

Bodies of water of Coles County, Illinois
Reservoirs in Illinois